Stu Jacobs (born 25 October 1965) is a New Zealand association football player and manager who represented New Zealand and coached the New Zealand Men's Olympic team at the 2008 Olympic Games in Beijing. In October 2016 he was awarded Capital Football Federation's Coach of the Year award for leading Wellington Olympic to victory winning the Central League competition.

Playing career
Jacobs made his full All Whites debut in a 0–2 loss to Fiji on 25 November 1988 and ended his international playing career with 16 A-international caps to his credit, his final cap being in a 0–5 loss to Indonesia on 21 September 1997.

Coaching career
Jacobs moved into football management after his playing career ended and was the head coach of the New Zealand "Olywhites" Olympic team at the 2008 Olympic Games in Beijing.

References 

1965 births
Living people
New Zealand association footballers
New Zealand international footballers
Central Coast Mariners FC non-playing staff
People educated at Palmerston North Boys' High School
1996 OFC Nations Cup players
Association football midfielders